BAC Credomatic is a financial group in Central America, with operations in Guatemala, El Salvador, Honduras, Nicaragua (where it was founded and former headquarters in the city of Managua), Costa Rica (current headquarters), Panama, Grand Cayman, The Bahamas, and the United States.

History

Founded in 1952 in Managua as Banco de América Central, BAC was the forerunner of what is now known as the BAC Credomatic Group (Spanish: Grupo BAC Credomatic). By the seventies, the bank ventured into the business of credit cards using the Credomatic brand.

In the mid eighties, the Group decided to enter other markets in the region, starting in Costa Rica with the acquisition of what is now known as Banco BAC San José. BAC Credomatic has presence all over Central America, as well as in the United States, Cayman Islands and The Bahamas.

In 2004 The Group started its credit card operations in Mexico, which was later sold to Banco Invex in 2016. 

In December 2010, Grupo Aval completed the purchase of the BAC Credomatic banking group.

In 2016, Credomatic de México S.A. de C.V., a subsidiary of BAC International Inc., signed a contract to transfer to Banco Invex S.A. its Mexican credit cards business

In 2017 the group started to use BAC Credomatic as brand for all their bank and credit card services, using a new modern logo.

See also

Grupo Aval Acciones y Valores

External links

“BAC está en el mejor momento de su historia” - Economía Diario El Mundo
Bac Unifica marca

References

Banks established in 1952
Banks of Nicaragua